Philippine Science High School Central Visayas Campus (PSHS-CVisC) is a campus of the Philippine Science High School System for region VII, a specialized public high school in the Philippines.

References

External links
PSHS Central Visayas Campus official website

Philippine Science High School System
High schools in Cebu